Judge is an unincorporated community in Osage County, in the U.S. state of Missouri.

History
A post office called Judge was established in 1914, and remained in operation until 1922. The community was named for the fact A. J. Branson, a local judge, was the original owner of the town site.

References

Unincorporated communities in Osage County, Missouri
Unincorporated communities in Missouri
Jefferson City metropolitan area